Gorham or Goreham may refer to:

People
Arthur F. Gorham (1915–1943), American soldier
Benjamin Gorham (1775–1845), American politician
Christopher Gorham (born 1974), American actor
Claire Gorham (born c. 1966), English journalist and television presenter
Eville Gorham (1925–2020), Canadian-American scientist
Frederic Poole Gorham (1871–1933), American bacteriologist
Geoffrey de Gorham (fl. 1119–46), Norman English abbot and scholar
George Congdon Gorham (1832–1909), American politician and newspaper editor
George Cornelius Gorham (1787–1857), English cleric
Graeme Gorham (born 1987), Canadian ski jumper
Henry Stephen Gorham (1839–1920) English entomologist
John Gorham (graphic designer) (1937–2001), English graphic designer
John Gorham (military officer) (1709–1751), New England soldier, founder of Gorham's Rangers
John Gorham (physician) (1783–1829),  Harvard Medical School's first professor of chemistry and pharmacology
John Gorham Palfrey (1796–1881), American clergyman and historian
Joseph Goreham (1725–1790), British soldier, commander at the Battle of Fort Cumberland
Justin Gorham (born 1998), American basketball player in the Israeli Basketball Premier League
Kathleen Gorham (1928–1983), Australian ballerina
Kaye Goreham (fl. 1972), Australian flight attendant aboard hijacked Ansett Airlines Flight 232
Maurice Gorham (1902–1975), Irish journalist and broadcasting executive
Mel Gorham (born 1959), American actress
Nathaniel Gorham (1738–1796), American politician
Sire Richard Gorham (1917–2006), Bermudian soldier, aviator, businessman, and philanthropist
Robert Gorham, aka Rob da Bank (born 1973), British disc jockey
Sarah Gorham (born 1954), American poet
Scott Gorham (born 1951), American guitarist and songwriter

Places
Gorham, Illinois
Gorham, Kansas
Gorham, Maine
Gorham (CDP), Maine
Gorham High School (Maine)
Gorham, New Hampshire
Gorham (CDP), New Hampshire
Gorham, New York
Gorham (hamlet), New York
Gorham Township, Fulton County, Ohio
Gorham's Bluff, Alabama
Gorham's Cave, sea cave and prehistoric settlement site in Gibraltar
Phelps and Gorham Purchase, a 1788 land deal in what is now western New York state

Other uses
Gorham (horse), an Australian thoroughbred horse, winner of the 1981 Expressway Stakes
Gorham Manufacturing Company, an American silver manufacturing and bronze foundry company
Gorham's disease, a congenital disorder characterized by massive bone loss